Zé Rodrix (25 November 1947 – 22 May 2009) was a Brazilian composer, instrumentalist, and singer.  He was well known in his native country for performing with musical ensembles Sá, Rodrix & Guarabyra, Som Imaginário and Momento Quatro.

A native of Rio de Janeiro, José Rodrigues Trindade used a modified spelling of his middle name as part of his stage name throughout a career that spanned over four decades. Som Imaginario, with another well-known member, Robertinho Silva, accompanied Milton Nascimento and Gal Costa and, in 1971, Elis Regina's recording of his rock-rural "Casa no Campo" (with Tavito) became a huge hit. During the 1970s, Sá e Guarabyra would continue as a duo while Rodrix pursued a solo career.  Both acts played what they described as "rural rock", "a synthesis of the escapist dream depicted in the American folk-rock songs of the '60s within the reality of upcountry Brazil".

A longtime resident of São Paulo, Zé Rodrix died of natural causes  at the age of 61.

Discography

Group albums
1968: Momento Quatro - with Momento Quatro (Philips) 
1970: Som Imaginário - with Som Imaginário (Odeon)
1971: Passado, Presente & Futuro - with Sá, Rodrix e Guarabyra (Odeon)
1973: Terra - with Sá, Rodrix & Guarabyra (Odeon) 
2001: Outra Vez na Estrada - Ao Vivo - with Sá, Rodrix & Guarabyra (Som Livre)
2008: Amanhã - with Sá, Rodrix & Guarabyra (Som Livre)

Solo albums
1973: I Acto (Odeon) 
1974: Quem Sabe Sabe Quem Não Sabe Não Precisa Saber (Odeon) 
1976: Soy Latino Americano (EMI-Odeon) 
1977: Quando Será? (EMI-Odeon) 
1979: Hora Extra (EMI-Odeon) 
1979: Sempre Livre (RCA Victor) 
1981: Seu Abelardo/Rock do Planalto (Continental)
1983: Saqueando a Cidade - with Joelho de Porco (Lira Paulistana/Continental) 
1988: 18 Anos Sem Sucesso - with Joelho de Porco (Eldorado)

Soundtracks
Batimam e Robim (1993) 
Oh! Rebuceteio (1984)
Amor de Perversão (1982)
Mulheres... Mulheres (1981)
Viagem ao Céu da Boca (1981) 
Massacre em Caxias (1979)
As Grã-Finas e o Camelô (1976)
O Sexomaníaco (1976)
O Esquadrão da Morte (1975)
Corrida do Ouro (1975)
Motel (1974)
O Sexo das Bonecas (1974) 
Salve-se Quem Puder

References

External links

1947 births
2009 deaths
Brazilian male guitarists
Brazilian composers
RCA Victor artists
Musicians from Rio de Janeiro (city)
Musicians from São Paulo
20th-century guitarists
20th-century male musicians